Lois Abbingh (born 13 August 1992) is a Dutch female handballer who plays as a left back for Odense Håndbold and the Dutch national team. She competed at the 2020 Summer Olympics.

Career
In 2011, she was a key player of the Dutch team that reached the final of the Women's 19 European Championship, just to fell short against Denmark in a close battle to 27–29. Abbingh scored 65 goals in the tournament and won the top scorer's award.

She represented the Netherlands in six World Women's Handball Championship (winning a silver in Denmark 2015, a bronze in Germany 2017, and winning gold in Japan 2019), in four European Women's Handball Championship (winning a silver in Sweden 2016) and two editions of the Olympic Games (finishing fourth in Rio 2016 and fifth in Tokyo 2020). At the World Championship in 2017 she became a member of the All-Star team (as the best Left Back of the competition) and she was among the top goalscorers, ranking second with her 58 goals scored.

Achievements
Danish Handball League:
Winner: 2021, 2022
 Danish handball Cup:
 Winner: 2020
DHB-Pokal:
Winner: 2012
Cupa României:
Winner: 2015
Baia Mare Champions Trophy:
Winner: 2014

Awards and recognition
Eredivise Top Scorer: 2010
Top-Scorer of the European Junior Championship: 2011
All-Star Left Back of the World Championship: 2017
Top-Scorer of the World Championship: 2019
Handball-Planet.com All-Star Left Back of the Year: 2019
 MVP of the Danish handball Cup 2020

References

External links

 
 
 

1992 births
Living people
Dutch female handball players
Sportspeople from Groningen (city)
Dutch expatriate sportspeople in Denmark
Dutch expatriate sportspeople in France
Dutch expatriate sportspeople in Germany
Dutch expatriate sportspeople in Romania
Dutch expatriate sportspeople in Russia
Expatriate handball players
CS Minaur Baia Mare (women's handball) players
Handball players at the 2016 Summer Olympics
Olympic handball players of the Netherlands
Handball players at the 2020 Summer Olympics
21st-century Dutch women